Kahnuk may refer to:
 Kahnuk, Dalgan, Sistan and Baluchestan Province
 Kahnuk, Khash, Sistan and Baluchestan Province
 Kahnuk, alternate name of Kahnak, Nukabad, Khash County, Sistan and Baluchestan Province
 Kahnuk, South Khorasan
 Kahnuk Rural District, in Sistan and Baluchestan Province